Altunhisar is a town and district of Niğde Province in the Central Anatolia region of Turkey. In 2012, it had a population of 14,416 of whom 2,969 lived in the town of Altunhisar.

Located on the Niğde plain to the north of the Melendiz mountains, 16 km for Bor and 30 km from the city of Niğde. Altunhisar is famous for its apples. The Cypriot company Unifrutti has invested heavily in the production of these and other fruits in the district.

References

External links
 District governor's official website 
 District municipality's official website 
 Web portal of Niğde 

Towns in Turkey
Populated places in Niğde Province
Districts of Niğde Province